Zelaya is a former department in Nicaragua. The department was located along the Mosquito Coast bordering the Caribbean Sea and was named after former President of Nicaragua José Santos Zelaya, who conquered the region for Nicaragua from the Mosquito Coast, then a British protectorate and indigenous monarchy, in 1894. The capital was Bluefields.

In 1987 it was divided into two autonomous regions:

 North Caribbean Coast Autonomous Region (RACCN)
 South Caribbean Coast Autonomous Region (RACCS)

Departments of Nicaragua
1987 disestablishments